The boys' 100 metre backstroke event at the 2018 Summer Youth Olympics took place on 7 and 8 October at the Natatorium in Buenos Aires, Argentina.

Results

Heats
The heats were started on 7 October at 10:38.

Semifinals

The semifinals were started on 7 October at 18:15.

Final
The final was held on 8 October at 18:00.

References

Swimming at the 2018 Summer Youth Olympics